Gianluca Berti (born 20 May 1967) is an Italian former professional footballer who played as a football goalkeeper.

Football career
Berti was born in Florence. He started playing professionally with A.C. Prato, in the third division, representing Olbia Calcio in the same level, in 1990–91.

From 1991 to 2007, he alternated between the Serie A and B, with Genoa C.F.C., Pisa Calcio, A.C. Ancona, U.S. Città di Palermo (playing 42 matches in the Sicilians 2004 top flight promotion), A.S. Roma, A.C. Reggiana 1919, Ravenna Calcio, Empoli F.C., Parma F.C., Torino F.C., ACF Fiorentina, U.C. Sampdoria and A.C. Cesena.

In June 1998, Gianluca Berti was transferred to Perugia, in exchanged with Stefano Guidoni, but in July he left for Ravenna.

Aged 41, after still managing 11 first division appearances for Sampdoria, in 2006–07, Berti re-joined the third level in 2008, moving to Novara Calcio, in the Serie C1/Lega Pro Prima Divisione.

He left professional football in 2009, joining Eccellenza Tuscany side Jolly & Montemurlo.

Honours
Palermo
 Serie B: 2003–04

References

External links
Fiorentina profile 
Sampdoria profile 

1967 births
Living people
Footballers from Florence
Association football goalkeepers
Italian footballers
Serie A players
Serie B players
A.C. Prato players
Olbia Calcio 1905 players
Genoa C.F.C. players
Pisa S.C. players
A.C. Ancona players
A.S. Roma players
Palermo F.C. players
A.C. Reggiana 1919 players
Ravenna F.C. players
Empoli F.C. players
Parma Calcio 1913 players
Torino F.C. players
ACF Fiorentina players
U.C. Sampdoria players
A.C. Cesena players
Novara F.C. players